New Road is a cricket ground in the English city of Worcester. It has been the home ground of Worcestershire County Cricket Club since 1896. Since October 2017 the ground has been known for sponsorship purposes as Blackfinch New Road following a five-year sponsorship arrangement with Blackfinch Investments.

Overview 
The ground is situated in central Worcester, on the west bank of the River Severn, overlooked by Worcester Cathedral on the opposite bank.  Immediately to the northwest is a road called New Road, part of the A44, hence the name. To the northwest is Cripplegate Park.

Until 1976, the ground was owned by the Dean and Chapter of Worcester Cathedral. The capacity of the ground is 4,500, small by first-class standards.

There is a small cricket shop located just outside the ground, selling cricket equipment, clothing, books and accessories. This shop opened in July 2008, replacing a long-standing older shop inside the ground. The shop also contains the administrative office for ticket sales and enquiries.

The ground is often flooded in winter by the nearby river, and was severely affected by the floods of July 2007, leading to the cancellation of several matches, and losses that were estimated to take nine years to recoup.

Elton John performed at Worcester Cricket Ground in June 2006.

International cricket

New Road has hosted three men's One Day Internationals: one in the 1983 World Cup, when Gordon Greenidge scored 105 not out (the only ever men's international century at the ground) to take the West Indies to an eight-wicket victory over Zimbabwe; and two in the 1999 World Cup: a six-wicket victory for Australia over Scotland and a four-wicket victory for Sri Lanka over Zimbabwe.

The ground has also seen nine Women's Test matches between 1951 and 2009, including the England Women's decisive victory during the 2005 Ashes, in which Katherine Brunt scored 52 and took match figures of 9/111; Brunt also took a first-innings 6/69 in the 2009 Ashes Test at Worcester, which was drawn. It has staged two Women's ODI in 2000 and 2019.

The England Lions (formerly England A) played a four-day match against the Australian touring side at New Road in 2009; in a drawn match, Mike Hussey (150) and Marcus North (191 not out) made runs, while Worcestershire's Stephen Moore responded with 120; Brett Lee took 6/76.

Records

Men's One-Day Internationals
 Matches: 3
 Highest team total:218/2 (48.3 overs) by West Indies v. Zimbabwe, 1983
 Lowest team total:181/7 (50 overs) by Scotland v. Australia, 1999
 Highest individual innings:105* by Gordon Greenidge for West Indies v. Zimbabwe, 1983
 Best bowling in an innings:3–30 by Pramodya Wickramasinghe for Sri Lanka v. Zimbabwe, 1999

Women's Tests
 Matches: 9
 Highest team total:427/4 declared by Australia Women v. England Women, 1998
 Lowest team total:63 by New Zealand Women v. England Women, 1954
 Highest individual innings:190 by Sandhya Agarwal, India Women v. England Women, 1986
 Best bowling in an innings:7/34 by Gill McConway, England Women v. India Women, 1986
 Best bowling in a match:9/107 by Mary Duggan for England Women v. Australia Women, 19519/111 by Katherine Brunt for England Women v. Australia Women, 2005

First-class
 Highest team total:701/4 declared by Leicestershire v. Worcestershire, 1906 701/6 declared by Worcestershire v Surrey, 2007
 Lowest team total:30 by Hampshire v. Worcestershire, 1903
 Triple centuries:331* by Jack Robertson for Middlesex v. Worcestershire, 1949315* by Graeme Hick for Worcestershire v. Durham, 2002311* by Glenn Turner for Worcestershire v. Warwickshire, 1982
 Ten wickets in an innings:10–51 by Jack Mercer for Glamorgan v. Worcestershire, 193610–76 by Jack White for Somerset v. Worcestershire, 1921
 Fifteen wickets in a match:15–106 by Reg Perks for Worcestershire v. Essex, 193715–175 by Jack White for Somerset v. Worcestershire, 1921

List A
 Highest team total:404/3 (60 overs) by Worcestershire v. Devon, 1987
 Lowest team total:45 (23.4 overs) by Hampshire v. Worcestershire, 1988
 Highest individual innings:172* by Graeme Hick v. Devon, 1987
 Best bowling in an innings:6–14 by Jack Flavell for Worcestershire v. Lancashire, 19636–14 by Howard Cooper for Yorkshire v. Worcestershire, 19756–16 by Shoaib Akhtar for Worcestershire v. Gloucestershire, 2005

See also
List of cricket grounds in England and Wales

References

Cricket grounds in Worcestershire
Sport in Worcester, England
Roads in Worcestershire
Transport in Worcester, England
Sports venues completed in 1896
1999 Cricket World Cup stadiums
1983 Cricket World Cup stadiums